Haman County (Haman-gun) is a county in South Gyeongsang Province, South Korea.  The local government is seated in Gaya-eup.  The county magistrate is Seok Gyu Jin.

In the early Common Era, Haman was the seat of Ara Gaya, a leading state of the Gaya confederacy.  Many relics from this period are still preserved in the county.  After the fall of Gaya, Haman was absorbed into Silla as Asirang-gun; in 757 its name was changed to Haman-gun, which it bears today.

It borders Changwon-si to the east and south, Changyeong-gun to the north and Uiryeong-gun to the west. It comprises 3.9% of Gyeongsangnam-do. Haman-gun stretches 29 km from east to west and 26 km from north to south.  It is located roughly in the center of Gyeongsnam-do. The county is fairly mountainous with Gaya-eup being in the river valley. The highest peak in Haman-gun is Yeohang-san (770m). There are many tributaries of the Nakdong and Namgang rivers in Haman. The Namgang River serves as the county line between Uiryeong and Haman and the Nakdong river as the county line between Haman and Changyeong.

Transportation

It is convenient in location being that the Namhae Expressway (Interchange 10) goes through the middle of it. It takes roughly 25 minutes from Haman Intercity Bus Terminal to Masan Intercity Bus Terminal in Hapseong-dong. Buses leave every 30–40 minutes. Uiryeong-gun can also be easily reach by bus from Haman Bus Terminal. However, other surrounding locations are hard to reach by bus from Haman. There are also two train stations that lie within Haman-gun (Gaya-eup and Gunbuk-myeon) making it possible to reach locations such as Suncheon, Jung-ri, Masan, Changwon and Busan by train. However, train schedules in Haman are sporadic making it more convenient to take a bus to Masan and travel onward from there. There are also a number of bike paths throughout Gaya-eup and downward into Haman-myeon. In other areas of the county, bike paths are lacking.

Economics and Industry

Haman-gun is an agrarian county. It is particularly famous for the watermelon. There is a watermelon festival held every year in Hamju Park, Gaya-eup in April.  It is grown and produced throughout the county in the tributaries of the Nakdong and Namgang rivers. The output per year is 48,217 tons. Some other agricultural products that are grown in Haman are the persimmon, melons, cherry tomatoes, peaches, lotus root, gold melons and grapes. There are a number of factories in Haman-gun with the heaviest concentration being in Chriwon-myeon and Chirseo-myeon.

There is also a market day held every five days in Gaya-eup in the Gaya Market. When the market is open, the farmers from all over the county come to the market to display their fresh produce. There are also many different kinds of vendor that sell meat, fish, snacks and clothes.

Tourism

Haman-gun is not known for its tourism industry and tourists from other countries are rare. However, There are a number of historical sites, temples and mountains to explore in the county. Haman-gun has a number of good places to hike. Chief amongst them is Yeohang-san (770m) located in Yeohang-myeon, Jueseo-ri. It is located in Yeohangsan Provincial Park in Yeohang-san on secondary Rural Road 1021 which branches off Highway 79. There are four hiking courses originating at different points. Two other peaks in Haman are Bangeosan in Gunbuk-myeon and Jakdaesan in Chriwon-myeon, Ungok-ri.

The Ancient Tomb Complex in Dohang-ri and Malsan-ri in Gaya-eup is another site worth seeing in Haman. It contains around 1000 tombs in mound form which are supposedly the tombs of kings. The largest royal tomb is Tomb 34. It is 39.3m in diameter and 9.7m in height. There is also a museum that accompanies the park. The exhibits are in Korean so admission is free for foreign visitors.

Ipgok County Park in Sanin-myeon, Ipgok-ri is also a particular area of interest in Haman. It can be reached by taking bus 252-2 and 114-1 from any bus stop in Gaya going towards Jung-ri and Masan. It is 4 km from the town center. It is the biggest reservoir in Haman with a circumference of 4 km. There are a number hiking paths and it is frequently visited by local families and fishermen on the weekends. There are also some multiple purpose grounds for soccer and volleyball. It is a nice place to visit in spring to see the azaleas and in the fall to see the changing leaves. Hamju Park in Gaya-eup, Dohang-ri is another place the locals visit for leisure. There is also a stadium there and sports facilities.

Cultural Events

There are two festivals in Haman. The first being the Araje Festival which is held on the weekend that April 15 falls. There are a number of cultural and sports events that commemorate the Ara Gaya.

There is also the Watermelon Festival which is also held on a weekend April at Hamju Park in Dohang-ri, Gaya-eup. There are a number of entertainment events, concerts and fireworks. There is also a display of carved watermelons which is quite interesting to see.

Education
Educational facilities: 32 schools (elementary 19/middle 8 /high 5), covering 7,830 students. Some of the elementary schools have less than 30 students.

Administrative divisions
Haman is divided into 8 myeon and 2 eup, as follows:
Gaya-eup
Beopsu-myeon
Chirbuk-myeon
Chilseo-myeon
Chirwon-eup
Daesan-myeon
Gunbuk-myeon
Haman-myeon
Sanin-myeon
Yeohang-myeon

Climate

Twin towns – sister cities
Haman  is twinned with:

  Dobong-gu, Seoul, South Korea 
  Gangseo-gu, Seoul, South Korea 
  Jangseong, South Jeolla, South Korea
  Liaoyang, Liaoyang, Liaoning, China

See also
 Geography of South Korea

References

External links

County government website

 
Counties of South Gyeongsang Province